Roy E. Naleid (November 12, 1901 – July 7, 1987) was a member of the Wisconsin State Assembly.

Biography
Naleid was born in Racine, Wisconsin. He attended Marquette University.

Career
Naleid was elected to the Assembly in 1954. Additionally, he was Vice Chairman of the Racine County, Wisconsin Board. He was a Democrat. He died on July 7, 1987.

References

Politicians from Racine, Wisconsin
County supervisors in Wisconsin
Democratic Party members of the Wisconsin State Assembly
Marquette University alumni
1901 births
1987 deaths
20th-century American politicians